Ilija Matejić (born 23 January 1991) is a politician in Serbia. He has served in the National Assembly of Serbia since 2020 as a member of the Serbian Progressive Party.

Early life and private career
Matejić was born in Kovačica, Vojvodina, in what was then the Republic of Serbia in the Socialist Federal Republic of Yugoslavia. He holds a Bachelor of Laws degree from the University of Belgrade Faculty of Law and is a lawyer by profession. He lives in the village of Crepaja in Kovačica.

Politician
Matejić appeared in the twenty-fifth position on the Progressive Party's electoral list for the Kovačica municipal assembly in the 2016 Serbian local elections. The list won twenty-one mandates. He was not returned and does not appear to have received a mandate as a replacement delegate over the next four years.

He was given the 176th position on the party's Aleksandar Vučić — For Our Children list in the 2020 Serbian parliamentary election and was elected when the list won a landslide majority with 188 mandates. He is a member of the assembly committee on constitutional and legislative issues; a deputy member of the European integration committee and the agriculture, forestry, and water management committee; and a member of Serbia's delegation to the Inter-Parliamentary Union.

References

1991 births
Living people
People from Kovačica
Members of the National Assembly (Serbia)
Delegates to the Inter-Parliamentary Union Assembly
Serbian Progressive Party politicians